Hodgkins may refer to:

In people
 Frances Hodgkins, an abstract painter
 Louise Manning Hodgkins (1846-1935), American educator, author, editor
 W. M. Hodgkins, New Zealand painter, father of Frances Hodgkins

In places
 Hodgkins, Illinois, a village in the United States
 Hodgkins Seamount, in the northern Pacific Ocean
 Hodgkins (crater), a crater on Mercury

Other uses
 Hodgkin's lymphoma, a type of cancer

See also
 Hodgkin, a surname